The Men's 50m Freestyle event at the 10th FINA World Aquatics Championships swam on 25–26 July 2003 in Barcelona, Spain. Preliminary and Semifinal heats swam on July 25, while the Final swam July 26.

Prior to the championships, the following World (WR) and Championship (CR) records were:
WR: 21.64 swum by Alexander Popov (Russia) on 16 June 2000 in Moscow, Russia
CR: 22.05 swum by Anthony Ervin (USA) on 22 July 2001 in Fukuoka, Japan

Results

Final

Semifinals

Preliminaries

References

Swimming at the 2003 World Aquatics Championships